State Highway 77 (SH 77) is a State Highway in Kerala, India that starts at Lakkidi Road. It is located in Thrissur and Palakkad districts.

The Route is Lakkidi road - Pambadi Road - Lakkidi Railway Station Road.

References

State Highways in Kerala
Roads in Thrissur district
Roads in Palakkad district